Charles Phillip Lantz (December 14, 1884 – May 6, 1962) was an American football, basketball, baseball coach and college athletics administrator.  He was the sixth head football coach at Eastern Illinois University in Charleston, Illinois, serving 24 seasons, from 1911 to 1935 and again in 1944, compiling a record of 95–66–13. In 1967, the Lantz Arena complex was opened and named in his honor.

Lantz graduated from Gettysburg College in 1908.  He died on May 6, 1962, in Naples, Florida.

Head coaching record

Football

See also
 List of college football head coaches with non-consecutive tenure

References

External links
 

1884 births
1962 deaths
American football quarterbacks
Baseball third basemen 
Basketball coaches from Pennsylvania
Guards (basketball)
Eastern Illinois Panthers athletic directors
Eastern Illinois Panthers baseball coaches
Eastern Illinois Panthers football coaches
Eastern Illinois Panthers men's basketball coaches
Gettysburg Bullets baseball players
Gettysburg Bullets football players
Gettysburg Bullets men's basketball players
People from Cumberland County, Pennsylvania
Players of American football from Pennsylvania
Baseball players from Pennsylvania
Basketball players from Pennsylvania